Jan-Erik Åkerström (born 10 October 1935) is a Swedish bobsledder. He competed in the two-man event at the 1964 Winter Olympics.

References

1935 births
Living people
Swedish male bobsledders
Olympic bobsledders of Sweden
Bobsledders at the 1964 Winter Olympics
Sportspeople from Stockholm